William Herbert "Will" Bloss, Sr. (April 4, 1869 – June 22, 1921) was the first American football coach at Oregon Agricultural College (later known as Oregon State University) in 1893 and again in 1897.  He also was the quarterback of the 1893 team. Bloss was heralded by contemporaries as a "great coach" and one of the fiercest players on the field of the first two decades of football in the Pacific Northwest.

Biography

Early life
Will Bloss was born April 4, 1869 in Orleans, Indiana.

Bloss was the son of John McKnight Bloss, a Civil War veteran and president of State Agricultural College (now Oregon State University) from 1892 to 1896.  Bloss attended Indiana University where he was a star player on the football team.  Bloss moved to Corvallis, Oregon shortly after his father did in June 1892.

Coaching career

The school later known as Oregon State University's first season of football was in 1893, and Bloss was instrumental in organizing the team.  At that time, Oregon State was known as Oregon Agricultural College, OAC.  William H. Bloss became the school's first coach, as well as the quarterback of the 1893 team. He was regarded years later as "a great coach and one of the fiercest players that ever figured in the game in the Northwest."

Bloss scheduled tryouts in the fall of 1893 in an attempt to assemble a football team.  By mid-October, he had found 17 players that would make up the first football team in Oregon State's history.  The team was a hodgepodge of young men in Corvallis.  Four players were not even students, including Coach Bloss.  One was a high school junior and another was a faculty member.

The first game was played on November 11, 1893 at 2:00pm at College Field on Lower Campus against Albany College.  Over 500 spectators who paid a dime admission cheered on SAC (State Agriculture College of Oregon) to 62–0 win, a blowout by today's standards but even worse considering touchdowns were only worth four points at the time.  Brady F. Burnett scored Oregon State's first touchdown in school history on a fumble return for a touchdown.  In that first season, SAC went on to a 5–1 record.

Bloss left Corvallis after that first season, but returned to coach the 1897 season.  He did not quarterback the team.  He led SAC to a 5–0 season, including victories over Oregon and Washington.  With those two wins, the team claimed their first "championship", as they proclaimed themselves the "champions of the northwest".

Life after football

In 1908 Will Bloss was said to be working as a civil engineer in "one of the southern states."

During his last 14 years, Bloss worked as a district sales manager for the Ohio Brass Company. He was a Scottish Rite Freemason and a member of the Benevolent and Protective Order of Elks.

Bloss died suddenly at his home at 2:30 am the morning of June 22, 1921. He was survived by his wife, a daughter, and two sons. Bloss was buried at a family plot in Muncie, Indiana.

Head coaching record

See also
 List of college football head coaches with non-consecutive tenure

Footnotes

1869 births
1921 deaths
American football quarterbacks
Indiana Hoosiers football players
Oregon State Beavers football coaches
Oregon State Beavers football players
People from Orange County, Indiana
Players of American football from Indiana